Boy with a Finger in His Mouth is a c.1530 oil on panel painting by Parmigianino, now in a private collection. In his right hand he holds a tablet with his ABC. Arturo Quintavalle argued it was a copy after Parmigianino, but most other art historians argue it to be an autograph work.

It is first recorded in a 1612 inventory of Barbara Sanseverino's goods described as "[a painting] by Parmigianino showing a 'putta' with a finger in its mouth and a tola in brass". It was later exhibited at the Palazzo del Giardino in Parma and was then mentioned in a 1680 inventory as "a head of a "puttino" with knotted hair holding a finger of its left hand in its mouth and with a canvas with an alphabet in its right hand, by Parmigianino" and in a 1785 inventory as a "sketch of a boy joking". The work then passed to an art dealer and was published in 1930 by Frölich-Bum, at which time it was in the Frey collection in Paris. Freedberg published it again in 1950, when it was in the Gouldstikker Gallery in Amsterdam.

References

Paintings by Parmigianino
Paintings of children
1530 paintings